Hanbury Hall is a large 18th-century stately home standing in parkland at Hanbury, Worcestershire. The main range has two storeys and is built of red brick in the Queen Anne style. It is a Grade I listed building, and the associated Orangery and Long Gallery pavilion ranges are listed Grade II*. It is managed by the National Trust and is open to the public.

History

18th Century 
Hanbury Hall was built by the wealthy chancery lawyer Thomas Vernon in the early 18th century. Thomas Vernon was the great-grandson of the first Vernon to come to Hanbury, Worcestershire, Rev Richard Vernon (1549–1628).

Hanbury Hall is thought to stand on the site of the previous mansion, Spernall Hall, and Thomas Vernon first describes himself as ‘of Hanbury Hall’ in 1706, and this and other evidence leads to a likely completion date of about 1706. The date of 1701 above the front door is thought to be a Victorian embellishment, but no building accounts are known to exist.

Although Hanbury Hall appears to be of a very uniform style, the rear wall is clearly of a different and rather earlier style, and may mark the first phase of a building campaign when Thomas Vernon and his wife Mary first came into possession of Spernall Hall in 1692 when his bachelor uncle John Vernon died.

The original plan of the Hall had a large undivided central hall with the main staircase leading off it, with many rather small rooms in the corner pavilions and north range – the south range was given over mainly to service rooms. The 18th-century Worcestershire historian Treadway Nash, in his Collections for the History of Worcestershire, wrote “Here is a large handsome house built by Counsellor Vernon about the year 1710 when a bad style of architecture prevailed; many windows and doors, rooms small, many closets, few arched cellars, large stables and offices in full view, are marks of that time”.

When the heiress Emma Vernon (1754–1818) married Henry Cecil, 1st Marquess of Exeter in 1776, Cecil clearly was of the same opinion, as he remodelled the interior (other than the great hall) creating larger rooms and enlarging the north east pavilion. On the south façade, having removed a doorway he repositioned all the windows to lie under their first floor equivalent. On the south side there had been large formal gardens, clearly shown in Dougharty's perspective drawing contained in the estate maps of the 1730s, and Cecil swept all these away (including the farm buildings in front of the Hall) and landscaped the park in the fashion of the time – he would have had contact with Capability Brown when being brought up by his uncle 9th Earl of Exeter at Burghley House.

Emma had given birth a couple of times but none of them lived past infancy. The local vicar in Hanbury at that time, William Sneyd, became a regular guest at Hanbury Hall, and unknown to Mr. Cecil, the vicar and Emma were in a full-blown secret relationship, with Emma often sneaking away from her home to visit her lover. They were so desperate to be together freely that they hatched a plan to elope together. She was refused access by her ex-husband as he sold off all the contents of the house. After he died in 1804, Emma finally moved into her childhood home with her third husband. Philips. She later died in 1818. There have been many sightings of her ghost, dressed all in black, moving through the same route she used to take from Hanbury Hall to visit her lover the vicar.

19th Century 

Following Henry and Emma's divorce in 1791 the contents were all sold, and the house remained empty until Henry's death in 1804, when Emma and her third husband, John Phillips, were able to regain possession. As the house had lain unoccupied for so long, many repairs had to be carried out at that time. Emma died in 1818 and left her second cousin, Thomas Shrawley Vernon (1759-1825), as the heir to her estate after the death of her husband John Phillips. Phillips married again and had two daughters in Hanbury before finally moving out in 1829. From then, the eldest son of Emma's heir, Thomas Tayler Vernon (1792–1835), was able to occupy it. His grandson Harry Foley Vernon (1834–1920) MP, was created 1st Baronet of Hanbury in 1885.

20th Century 

Harry Vernon was succeeded by his son Sir (Bowater) George Hamilton Vernon (1865–1940), 2nd Baronet. Sir George led an unhappy life, separating from his wife Doris, and spending his last 10 years living with his secretary and companion Ruth Powick, who later changed her name by deed poll to Vernon. During this time the agricultural depression led to a reduction in rental income, and Hanbury Hall suffered a lack of care.

In poor health, Sir George Vernon took his own life in 1940.  There were no further heirs to the Baronetcy which became extinct.  Sir George's estranged wife was able to move back in after his death, dying there in 1962.

National Trust 
Negotiations led to the National Trust having the reversion, and after making essential repairs on Lady Vernon's death, the hall was let to tenants and opened to the public on a restricted basis. In recent years the hall has been managed more commercially and is now open daily. The site received 227,624 visitors during 2019.

House 
The main house is in the Queen Anne style, and has two stories plus an attic. It has red Flemish bond ashlar brickwork, with a tiled hipped roof, and large brick chimney stacks. The main house was listed by English Heritage on 29 December 1952, and is a Grade I listed building.

Paintings 

A notable feature of Hanbury Hall is the painting of the staircase, hall ceiling, and other rooms by the English painter Sir James Thornhill. They include a small representation of Rev Henry Sacheverell being cast to the furies – this relates to an incident in 1710 when Sacheverell, a Tory, was put on trial for sedition by the Whig government, and dates the paintings to that year. The focus of the paintings around the stairwell is the life of the Greek hero Achilles, as told by a range of classical sources. They are surmounted by a large representation of the Olympian gods on the ceiling.

List of paintings

Long Gallery 

It was listed along with an attached wall on 14 March 1969, and is Grade II*.It is currently used by the National Trust as a second hand bookshop.

Gardens

Formal gardens 

George London designed the original formal gardens in 1705, heavily influenced by the gardens of Het Loo Palace and the Palace of Versailles. At the end of the 18th century they were removed, to be replaced by open spaces.

The formal gardens were recreated in the 1990s, using the original plans from 1705 as well as later drawings. They were officially reopened on 28 July 1995.

Orangery 

The one-story rectangular building has red Flemish bond ashlar brickwork, with a tiled hip roof behind a parapet. The main elevation faces south, and has nine sets of windows, of which the central three are moved forward and are topped with a pediment, containing a carved fruit basket along with flowers and wreaths. The parapet has urn and pineapple finals. The inside of the building has a tiled floor. The Orangery, along with adjoining walls, were listed on 14 March 1969, and are now Grade II* listed.

References

External links

Country houses in Worcestershire
National Trust properties in Worcestershire
Houses completed in 1706
Historic house museums in Worcestershire
1706 establishments in England
Grade I listed buildings in Worcestershire
Queen Anne architecture in the United Kingdom
Grade I listed houses
Orangeries
William Talman buildings